The Grinnell Historical Museum is a non-profit organization focused on collection and preservation of the history of Grinnell and Poweshiek County, Iowa. The museum is located in the McMurray House at 1125 Broad Street, a part of the North Grinnell Historic District. They also create and maintain displays of local history materials at Drake Community Library and the Grinnell City Hall.

Formation and facilities 
The effort to form a Grinnell museum was started in 1950 by four Grinnell women's groups - two chapters of the Daughters of the American Revolution (DAR), the Historical and Literary Club, and the Tuesday Club. The began by collecting donations and funds and soon had items housed in the upper floor of a local business in downtown Grinnell. Sadly, in 1954, the building and most of the contents were destroyed by fire. Efforts continued until donations and funds allowed the purchase of a historic late-Victorian 10-room residence at 1125 Broad Street. The house has served as a community since that time. The Victorian house has been beautifully maintained with displays throughout.

In 2010, the museum began to do place displays of smaller items in their collection in display cases in the lobby of Drake Community Library in Grinnell. This space allows exhibitions of items like cameras, tools, sewing machines, and buttons in an area that receives high traffic. Museum staff have also been instrumental in the display of historical materials for the Iowa Transportation Museum located at Grinnell City Hall in the renovated Spaulding Manufacturing buildings.

Publications and research 
The museum has been instrumental in the publication of two books about the history of Grinnell. A children's book on the history of Grinnell was published in 2016. "Grinnell: Our Prairie Town" is used by area school children to learn the history of the area.  A book entitled "Grinnell Stories: African Americans of Early Grinnell" was published in 2020 by the museum. Included in this book are multiple chapters on the Renfrow family. Notable members of the family include Helen Lemme and Edith Renfrow Smith.

In 2017, the research of museum volunteers was instrumental in identifying the lost works of photographer Cornelia Clarke.

References

External links 
Video tour of the Grinnell Historical Museum from the Grinnell Chamber of Commerce.
Historic Walking Tour of Grinnell created by Grinnell Historical Museum in Historypin

Grinnell, Iowa
Museums in Iowa
Poweshiek County, Iowa